Siudo ko Sindor is a 2001 Nepali film which tells story of Nepalese girl who can easily break a marriage for money or hope.

Cast 
 Rajesh Hamal as Rajesh
 Niruta Singh as Menuka
 Jharana Bajracharya as Dwiti
 Neer Shah as Javinder Dhan Veer
 Ratan Subedi as Rajesh's Sister
 Basundhara Bhushal as Rajesh's Mother

Music

See also

Cinema of Nepal
List of Nepalese films

References

External links
 

2001 films
2000s Nepali-language films
2001 drama films
Nepalese drama films
Cultural depictions of Nepalese women

ne:झरना बज्राचार्य